is one of syllable in Javanese script that represent the sound /ʋɔ/, /ʋa/. It is transliterated to Latin as "wa", and sometimes in Indonesian orthography as "wo".

Pasangan 
Its pasangan form , is located on the bottom side of the previous syllable. For example,  - anak wadon (a girl).

Extended form 
The letter ꦮ doesn't have a murda form.

Using cecak telu, the syllable represents /v/.

Glyphs

Unicode block 

Javanese script was added to the Unicode Standard in October, 2009 with the release of version 5.2.

References 

Javanese script